Abastumani is a village in the Adigeni Municipality, Samtskhe-Javakheti, Georgia. It is located on the southern slopes of the Meskheti Range on the left bank of the Otskhe river.

Population 
2002 census: 371
2014 census: 256

References 

Populated places in Adigeni Municipality